Ivana Jorović (born 3 May 1997) is an inactive Serbian tennis player.

She has won thirteen singles and three doubles titles on the ITF Circuit. On 15 July 2019, she reached her best singles ranking of world .

Playing for Serbia Billie Jean King Cup team, Jorović has a win–loss record of 13–10. She was nominated for the Fed Cup Heart Award in 2015 and 2017.

National representation

2015: Fed Cup debut
On 4 February, Jorović played her first Fed Cup match, in Europe/Africa Zone Group I, where Serbia played against Austria. She defeated Barbara Haas in straight sets. After that, she made her debut in doubles in Fed Cup, partnering Aleksandra Krunić; they won against Austrian combination Julia Grabher / Sandra Klemenschits, in straight sets. 

A day later, Serbia played against Hungary, and Ivana was chosen for the first match against Dalma Gálfi. She won that match, letting her opponent win only one game. Later, together with Aleksandra Krunić, she lost to Hungarian pair Tímea Babos/Réka Luca Jani, in three sets. 

In the Group I Play-offs, Serbia played against Croatia. Again, Jorović was chosen for the opening match and she defeated Ana Konjuh in three-sets. She also should compete in doubles, but Serbia already had won 2–0, so the match was canceled. 

In April, Serbia played against Paraguay for a place in the World Group II in the Play–offs. Ivana lost her match against Verónica Cepede Royg, in three sets, but with Aleksandra Krunić won in doubles against Cepede Royg and Montserrat González, in straight sets.

Junior career
Čačak-born Jorović was ranked the  junior tennis player in the world in June 2014, and was a finalist in girls' doubles at the Australian Open and girls' singles at the French Open in 2014.

Professional career

2014–2017: WTA Tour debut
Jorović won the QNet Open in New Delhi in 2014.

She made her WTA Tour main-draw debut at 2016 Jiangxi International Open in Nanchang, losing in the first round to fifth seed Zhang Kailin, in three sets.

In June 2017, she reached the quarterfinals of the WTA 125 Bol Open, where she lost to eventual champion Aleksandra Krunić.

2018: Grand Slam main-draw debut; biggest title to date

Jorović started her year in the Australian Open qualifying, where she made her Grand Slam main-draw debut, beating Arantxa Rus, Ysaline Bonaventure and Bibiane Schoofs, to advance to the main draw, where she was beaten by fourth seed Elina Svitolina. Then, she entered the $25k in Altenkirchen, where she lost to Chloé Paquet in the second round. At the $60k Zhuhai Open, she lost in the final round of qualifying to Xun Fangying, while at the $60k Shenzhen Open, she successfully made it through the qualifying but lost to Marta Kostyuk in the first round of the main draw. She played at another $60k in Croissy-Beaubourg, where she lost in the second round of qualifying to Jesika Malečková.

In April, Jorović entered two $25k events in Óbidos, winning the first one by beating Miriam Kolodziejová in the final, while in another she lost to Katie Swan in the quarterfinal. In the $100k Khimki Ladies Cup, she reached the quarterfinals, after beating Anastasia Gasanova and Dejana Radanović, but bowed out to Monica Niculescu. In May, she played in two $60k events in Japan, reaching the quarterfinals in Fukuoka Ladies Cup, where she lost to Momoko Kobori, and the second round of the Kurume Cup, retiring after only two games against Haruka Kaji.

In August, Jorović reached her second final of the season at the $25k Woking event, losing to Tereza Smitková. In her next tournament, the $25k event in Chiswick, she reached the semifinals losing to Vitalia Diatchenko. In late August, she made it to the quarterfinals of a $60k event in Budapest, where she lost to Barbara Haas.

In the Asian swing, Jorović reached the main draw of two WTA Tour events through qualifying in Guangzhou and Tashkent, respectively. She lost in the first round in Guangzhou, but beat Ekaterina Alexandrova in Tashkent for her first WTA Tour main-draw match win, before losing to Vera Lapko in the second round. She lost in the final qualifying round in Moscow to Vera Zvonareva and lost in the first round of main draw of the WTA 125 Mumbai Open, but won the $100k Shenzhen Open, where she beat Zheng Saisai in the final for her biggest career title to date. Her final tournament of the season was the WTA 125 Taipei Open where she beat Sabina Sharipova in the first round, before losing to Tereza Martincová in the second.

Performance timelines

Only main-draw results in WTA Tour, Grand Slam tournaments, Fed Cup/Billie Jean King Cup and Olympic Games are included in win–loss records.

Singles
Current after the 2021 Transylvania Open.

ITF Circuit finals

Singles: 16 (13 titles, 3 runner-ups)

Doubles: 4 (3 titles, 1 runner-up)

Junior Grand Slam finals

Girls' singles: 1 (runner–up)

Girls' doubles: 1 (runner–up)

Notes

References

External links

 
 
 

1997 births
Living people
Sportspeople from Čačak
Serbian female tennis players
Tennis players at the 2014 Summer Youth Olympics
Tennis players at the 2020 Summer Olympics
Olympic tennis players of Serbia